Brighouse railway station serves the town of Brighouse in West Yorkshire, England. The station lies on the Calder Valley line running west from Leeds. Opened in 1840, and closed in 1970, it reopened in 2000 and is served by Northern Trains and Grand Central services.

History

Brighouse railway station was first opened on 5 October 1840, as a main line station operated by the Manchester & Leeds Railway (M&L). The station was initially known as Brighouse for Bradford, as no stations had yet been built in Bradford itself. Similarly, Elland station served Halifax, and Huddersfield was served by the station at Cooper Bridge.

A lithograph was produced by Arthur Fitzwilliam Tait showing the station in 1845.

In 1847 Brighouse station came under the control of the Lancashire & Yorkshire Railway (L&Y), when the M&L was incorporated into that company. The station remained under L&Y operation until it was incorporated into the London, Midland & Scottish Railway in 1923. The station's importance had gradually declined because other lines connecting Manchester and Leeds were built via Halifax and Huddersfield, bypassing Brighouse.

Brighouse station passed into British Railways ownership upon nationalisation in 1948, and was operated as part of the North Eastern Region. The decline in passenger numbers continued, and the station closed on 5 January 1970. The line remained open throughout that time as a freight-only one, but it was also used as a diversionary route for passenger trains when other lines were closed.

Brighouse station reopened on 28 May 2000. Plans for a station in Elland to open at the same time as Brighouse were cancelled due to lack of funds.

Trains called every two hours on Sundays.

From 27 April 2008 a bus service MC4 provided a connection with most Leeds via Dewsbury trains to/from Elland. This was replaced in early 2010 by a revised service E8.

In December 2008, the service was supplemented by an hourly Leeds - Dewsbury - Hebden Bridge - Manchester Victoria -  stopping service (Monday - Saturday daytime only, no late evening or Sunday service). This provided a considerable service improvement providing both a twice-hourly frequency for journeys to/from Leeds and a reduction in journey time taking only 35 minutes to travel to Leeds via Dewsbury rather than 50 minutes via Halifax. Even without this important improvement in services, usage of the station has increased year on year since the reopening. Some services from Leeds terminate at Brighouse and start back from here.

In May 2010, Grand Central's Bradford Interchange to London service commenced.

In May 2018, the Sunday service from Leeds to Huddersfield via Brighouse was doubled in frequency to one per hour in each direction.

Services 

The Leeds service includes a faster journey via  and a slower journey via  and Bradford Interchange.

On Sundays there is one train per hour to Leeds (via Halifax and Bradford) and one train per hour to Huddersfield, where passengers can change for services to Manchester and fast services to Leeds.

In addition to the regular service pattern, there are four direct return services per day to London King's Cross via  and Doncaster, including Sundays.

From the December 2019 timetable change, the Leeds via Halifax service now terminates at Bradford Interchange on weekdays and Saturdays (it still operates through on Sundays).

Station facilities 

The station has two platforms.

 Platform 1: served by services towards Huddersfield and Leeds (via Dewsbury).
 Platform 2: served by services towards Manchester Victoria, and Leeds (via Halifax and Bradford Interchange).

Northern Rail and West Yorkshire Metro secured joint funding from the Department for Transport's Access for All – Small Schemes initiative to provide a new Customer Information System at the station.

New LCD style customer information screens with real-time information have been installed on both platforms linked into an improved public address system providing accurate, reliable audio/visual train running information to passengers.

In addition; Northern has announced plans to replace the station's HelpPoint intercom system with a more updated reliable model. This will enable passengers to speak to a member of staff in Northern's control centre for information or to summon assistance in emergency situations.

Station panorama

Filming location 
The station features in the award-winning BBC comedy The Thick of It, series 4 episode 4 (from minute 21).

References

External links 

Brighouse
Former Lancashire and Yorkshire Railway stations
Railway stations in Calderdale
DfT Category F1 stations
Railway stations in Great Britain opened in 1840
Railway stations in Great Britain closed in 1970
Railway stations in Great Britain opened in 2000
Reopened railway stations in Great Britain
Railway stations served by Grand Central Railway
Northern franchise railway stations